Art of Fighting is a series of video games released in the 1990s.

It may also refer to:
 Art of Fighting, an anime television special based on the first video game
 Art of Fighting (band), an Australian indie rock band
 Art of Fighting (film), a South Korean film
 Art of Fighting Anthology, a video game compilation of the Art of Fighting series for PlayStation 2